Ameles poggii is a species of praying mantis found in Libya.

References

poggii
Endemic fauna of Libya
Mantodea of Africa
Insects of North Africa
Insects described in 1986